The Oregon Water Trust (OWT), now operating as The Freshwater Trust, is an environmental organization based in the U.S. state of Oregon. Its mission is to restore surface water flows for healthier streams in Oregon by using cooperative, free-market solutions. OWT was founded in 1993 by a group with diverse water interests who sought to utilize the "tools of the land trust movement...and apply the same approach to the acquisition of water".  "With the success of OWT, water trusts have been created in Montana, Colorado, and Washington" with others emerging across the Western United States. Utilizing a transactional approach, the group focuses on streams where small amounts of water provide significant ecological benefits. The result is healthier streams for fish, wildlife, and people.

Overview
Oregon Water Trust targets efforts in those watersheds that have historically supported significant fisheries. Within each watershed, Oregon Water Trust identifies priority streams for which streamflow is a limiting factor for fish habitat and water quality and there is potential for acquiring water rights to convert to instream use to enhance flows. Oregon Water Trust concentrates acquisition efforts on small- to medium-sized tributaries that provide spawning and rearing for salmonids. In these systems, small amounts of water can provide significant ecological benefits.

Oregon Water Trust uses ecological, hydrologic and water rights data to identify priority streams and evaluate potential water right acquisitions. Analysis of streamflow and habitat conditions includes:

 Delineating fish use and distribution for each segment;
 Documenting the current and historical ecological value of the waterway for fish;
 Evaluating current habitat and water quality conditions;
 Describing the current water availability situation;
 Summarizing the relationship of the water right to other water rights in the stream segment; and
 Evaluating the potential benefits of acquired water on fish habitat and water quality.

Oregon Water Trust compiles data on species present, their habitat needs and endangered species listing status; instream conditions (e.g., flow alteration, temperature, water quality); and relation of instream conditions to riparian, upslope and watershed conditions and activities.

Approach
Oregon Water Trust's market-based approach provides water right holders in Oregon with a variety of incentives to convert their consumptive water rights to instream water rights. These include: income from marginally productive areas, replacement feed for lost production, funding for irrigation efficiency projects, a possible tax break for permanent donations of water rights, and flexibility in managing water rights.

Partners
Oregon Water Trust works with local and community groups, agency staff and others interested in water rights issues in order to add to, and not duplicate, the efforts of others. Whenever possible, Oregon Water Trust strives to work with communities to create cooperative solutions that benefit all parties.

Oregon Water Trust's board of directors represents agricultural, environmental, legal and tribal perspectives. This diverse board membership allows the organization to openly and effectively address the concerns of rural Oregonians regarding their livelihoods and the conservation of aquatic resources.

Project history 
It has been over 13 years since Oregon Water Trust completed their first paid lease with a rancher on Buck Hollow Creek in the Deschutes Basin. Since then Oregon Water Trust has increased their effectiveness dramatically. Today, their portfolio has grown to 160 ft³/s (4,500 L³/s) protected for instream use in 86 streams, representing in aggregate the equivalent to the flow of the Applegate River in August. Over the year, this constitutes  of water.

The Oregon Water Trust has implemented successful projects in basins which include the Deschutes, John Day, Willamette, and Rogue rivers.

See also 
 Water management

References

External links
Oregon Water Trust (official website)

Environmental organizations based in Oregon
Water organizations in the United States
Water in Oregon
1993 establishments in Oregon
Water conservation in the United States
1993 establishments in the United States
Environmental organizations established in 1993
Organizations established in 1993